Black Banks Creek is a stream in the U.S. state of South Dakota.

Black Banks Creek is lined with vertisol giving its banks a black tint.

See also
List of rivers of South Dakota

References

Rivers of Fall River County, South Dakota
Rivers of South Dakota